First Prize for the Cello is a French silent comedy directed by an anonymous director and released in 1907.

Plot
A man walks along with a cello under his arm. He then sits down on a stool and proceeds to play it, very badly, while the neighbors proceed throw all manner of things at him to make him stop. At one point, a couch is thrown at him, but neither this nor any other projectile is a successful deterrent. At the end of the film, a girl comes up to him and gives him some flowers. The man then stops playing and walks off, happy that his talents have been recognized.

See also
Silent film | Comedy film | French films: 1892-1909 | Silent comedy | 1907 in film

References 

 
 

1907 films
French silent short films
French black-and-white films
French comedy films
1907 comedy films
Silent comedy films
1900s French films